Yates's big-eared bat (Micronycteris yatesi) is a species of leaf-nosed bat found in Bolivia.

Taxonomy and etymology
Yates's big-eared bat was described as a new species in 2013.
The holotype had been collected in February 2007.
The eponym for the species name "yatesi" is Terry Lamon Yates, "for his pivotal contributions to the knowledge of Bolivian mammals, training Bolivian biologists, and starting collaborations that strengthened mammalian research and shaped current science and field biology in Bolivia."

Description
It has long fur, which measures  at its shoulders.
Individual hairs are bicolored, with the basal half whitish and the tip brown.
Its throat fur is white, while the rest of its ventral fur is buffy.

Range and habitat
It has been documented in several parts of Bolivia, including Oropeza Province, Chiquitos Province, and Florida Province.
This species also possibly occurs in Brazil, based on a Micronycteris specimen identified as Sanborn's big-eared bat that could actually have been Yates's big-eared bat.

Conservation
As of 2017, it is listed as a data deficient species by the IUCN.
It meets the criteria for this classification because there is little information regarding its population status or the extent of its geographic range.

References

Bats of South America
Mammals of Bolivia
Mammals described in 2013
Micronycteris